is a Japanese actress, investor, businesswoman, essayist, university professor (special appointment), and lifestyle (household chores) adviser. She divorced her husband Eiichiro Funakoshi in December, 2017. She is represented by the Kazuyo Matsui Jimusho agency.

Major films

Major television programmes

Dramas

Bibliography

References

External links
 
 – Ameba Blog 

Japanese actresses
Japanese television personalities
Japanese women essayists
1957 births
Living people
People from Shiga Prefecture